Gulabganj railway station is a railway station in Vidisha district, Madhya Pradesh. Its code is GLG. It serves Gulabganj town. The station consists of four platforms. It lacks many facilities including water and sanitation. Passenger and Express trains halt here.

References

Railway stations in Vidisha district
Bhopal railway division